Thomas's broad-nosed bat (Platyrrhinus dorsalis) is a species of bat in the family Phyllostomidae. It is found in Bolivia, Colombia, Ecuador, Panama, and Peru.

References

Platyrrhinus
Mammals of Colombia
Mammals described in 1900
Taxonomy articles created by Polbot
Taxa named by Oldfield Thomas
Bats of South America